Scyphomancy (Gk. skýphos, cup, or drinking bowl, and manteia, divination) is divination using a cup or goblet. This may involve forecasting or representing by using a cup of water and reading the signs specified by certain articles floating on the water. It is considered one of the oldest methods of foretelling the future by means of crystalline reflection, both in ancient Egypt and Persia.

Description
American folklorist Charles Godfrey Leland describes it in his 1891 book Gypsy Sorcery and Fortune Telling, in relation to the ritualistic practices of the Roma:

See also
Scrying
Psychomanteum

Notes

External links
The Occult Sciences: Sketches of the Traditions and Superstitions of Past
http://en.wikisource.org/wiki/Gypsy_Sorcery_and_Fortune_Telling/Chapter_14
http://www.sacred-texts.com/pag/gsft/gsft16.htm

Divination